An annular solar eclipse occurred on May 26, 1854. A solar eclipse occurs when the Moon passes between Earth and the Sun, thereby totally or partly obscuring the image of the Sun for a viewer on Earth. An annular solar eclipse occurs when the Moon's apparent diameter is smaller than the Sun's, blocking most of the Sun's light and causing the Sun to look like an annulus (ring). An annular eclipse appears as a partial eclipse over a region of the Earth thousands of kilometres wide.

Visibility
The annular path crossed close to the boundary between the United States and Canada.

Observations

Related eclipses 
It is a part of Solar Saros 135.

Solar eclipse set repeats every 6 synodic months (about 177.183 days).

Saros 135 

It is a part of Saros cycle 135, repeating every 18 years, 11 days, containing 71 events. The series started with partial solar eclipse on July 5, 1331. It contains annular eclipses from October 21, 1511, through February 24, 2305, hybrid eclipses on March 8, 2323, and March 18, 2341, and total eclipses from March 29, 2359, through May 22, 2449. The series ends at member 71 as a partial eclipse on August 17, 2593. The longest duration of totality will be 2 minutes, 27 seconds on May 12, 2431.

Notes

References

 Total Eclipses of the Sun, By Mabel Loomis Todd, 1894, new and revised edition by David P. Todd, 1900. 
 Suggestions relative to the observation of the solar eclipse of May 26, 1854, Astronomical Journal, vol. 3, iss. 70, p. 169–172 (1854). Alexander, S.
 On the solar eclipse of 1854, May 26, Bartlett, W. H. C. Astronomical Journal, vol. 4, iss. 77, p. 33–35 (1854).
 Observation of the annular eclipse of May 26, in the suburbs of Ogdensburgh, N. Y. Astronomical Journal, vol. 3, iss. 70, p. 169–172 (1854). Alexander, S.

1854 5 26
1854 in science
1854 5 26
May 1854 events